SanDisk has produced a number of flash memory-based digital audio and portable media players since 2005. The current range of products bear the SanDisk Clip name, a line of ultraportable digital audio players. SanDisk players were formerly marketed under the Sansa name until 2014.

Current models

SanDisk Clip Sport Go

The SanDisk Clip Sport Go was announced in 2018 by SanDisk, and subsequently released on March 2, 2019. It has a built-in microphone for voice recording. No microSDHC card slot.

SanDisk Clip Sport Plus
The SanDisk Clip Sport Plus was released in 2016, and is the first SanDisk MP3 player to add Bluetooth and water resistance. No microSDHC card slot.

SanDisk Clip Jam

The Clip Jam was released in 2015, and is similar to the Sansa Clip and Clip+ models. It has a microSDHC card slot.

Overview and comparison 

Note: Refers to latest version of the SanDisk firmware. Earlier version may have fewer features. Vorbis, FLAC, AAC, Replaygain and folder browsing are always included in Rockbox.

Source:

Discontinued models

SanDisk Clip Sport
The Clip Sport was announced on February 10, 2014, with capacities of 4GB, 8GB. It is similar to previous Clip models, with a larger screen and longer battery life, but with no voice recorder. Later firmware uses the menu button for locking. A microSDHC card slot is provided to increase the storage capacity, but it does not support slotRadio. This is the first SanDisk mp3 player to not carry the Sansa name. It was discontinued in late 2018.

Sansa Clip Zip 

On August 24, 2011, SanDisk announced the Sansa Clip Zip, an update to the Clip+. Two versions are available, a 4 GB model for US$50 and an 8 GB model for US$70. The 4 GB model comes in nine colors (red, blue, black, orange, white, grey, purple, lime and teal), while the 8 GB model is only available in black or grey.

The Clip Zip includes all the features of the Clip+ and is based on the same processor as the Clip+ and Fuze v2 but includes a larger 1.1-inch full-color OLED display with support for album art (but called "LCD" in a press release), redesigned controls, a Micro-USB connector, a new user interface similar to that of the Fuze+, a stopwatch, RDS radio capability and support for DRM-free AAC audio files (such as those purchased from the iTunes Store). The new Clip Zip will be sold alongside the Clip+. Internally the Clip Zip is similar to the Clip+ (apart from the Zip having a color screen), and so retains its high quality DAC and amplifier.

Sansa Fuze+ 

The Sansa Fuze+, announced on August 31, 2010, in capacities of 4 GB (US$79), 8 GB (US$89) & 16 GB (US$119), is a portable media player with a 2.4 inch color display (QVGA) and touch capability. It also features an FM radio with FM recording and RDS capability, a voice recorder, and 24 hours of audio playback from a single charge. It supports the following audio formats: MP3, WMA, Secure WMA, Ogg Vorbis, FLAC, AAC, Audible, Podcasts. For video it supports MPEG-4, H.264, and WMV. Storage is expandable via a microSDHC slot, and it can be used to play slotMusic and slotRadio cards.

Sansa Clip+ 

On August 31, 2009, SanDisk released a redesign of the Sansa Clip called the Sansa Clip+, cosmetically similar to the Clip and maintaining its basic design, audio hardware, compatibility, and 4-line OLED screen, but with a few significant differences. There are 2 GB (black), 4 GB (black, red, blue, white or indigo) and 8 GB (black) models. The case has been redesigned to look more square (including the navigation pad, which is also no longer backlit) and is constructed of higher-quality plastic, the clip is no longer removable, and the player now supports folder browsing and ReplayGain support. Transition times between tracks was reduced, but SanDisk officially declined to support gapless playback. A microSDHC card slot has been added, allowing the storage capacity of the device to be expanded by up to an additional 32 GB. The Clip+ also has added features when playing slotMusic and slotRadio. To make room for the microSDHC slot there have been some changes from the old Clip, including moving the volume switch to the left side of the device and changing the power/hold switch to a simple power button. Hold mode is now activated by holding the "Home" button on the device. Like previous Clip and Fuze products, the Clip+ retained a directly coupled headphone amplifier, allowing for highly accurate reproduction of bass frequencies and very low distortion on difficult to drive headphones.

The Sansa Clip+ proved popular with audio enthusiasts and programmers because of its very low cost, excellent DAC, and relatively mature Rockbox port. Rockbox substantially improves battery life and adds features such as parametric EQ, completely gapless playback and AAC audio playback.

The Clip+ replaced the discontinued Sansa Clip, with which it shared nearly identical hardware aside from the microSDHC slot.

Playlist support 
The Clip+ User Manual provides instructions for copying files and folders of music from a PC onto the internal and/or external memories, using the Windows Explorer application. It also provides instructions for creating playlists, using the Windows Media Player. However, varying degrees of success have motivated many users to experiment with other applications, such as Media Monkey and Winamp.

Slot Player 
 slotRadio Bundle
 slotRadio player
 slotMusic player

Sansa Fuze 

The Sansa Fuze, released on March 28, 2008 in capacities of 2, 4 and 8 GB, is a portable media player with a 1.9-inch color display and a thickness of 0.3 inches. It also features a 40-preset FM radio with FM recording, a voice recorder, and has a 24-hour battery life on continuous audio playback. Storage is expandable via a microSDHC slot. Firmware 1.01.22 enabled FLAC and Ogg Vorbis playback. Like the Clip, the Fuze went through two hardware revisions, the first based on the AS3525 (like the Clipv1) and the second based on the AS3525+ (like the Clipv2, Clip+ and Clip Zip). The latest firmware releases, depending on hardware version, are 01.02.31, 02.03.31 and 02.03.33.

Sansa Clip 

Also known as the m300, the Sansa Clip was released on October 9, 2007. The player is similar in size to the second-generation iPod Shuffle, but incorporates a removable clip and 4-line OLED screen (one line yellow, three blue.) The Clip has an FM tuner/recorder and a built-in microphone. The flash-based player ships in capacities of 1 GB (available only in black), 2 GB (available in black, blue, red and pink), and 4 GB (silver and black). In November 2008, black and silver 8 GB versions were advertised in the UK.

Midway through production of the Clip, SanDisk updated to a new hardware design based on an updated Austriamicrosystems SOC. The updated design moderately improved battery life by introducing a more efficient ARM9E processor in place of the previous ARM9 core. Aside from requiring different firmware upgrades, there were no functional changes to the software. The updated SOC would however form the basis for the Clip+ and Clip Zip products. Rockbox was released for the Clip v1 on November 21, 2009, and then for the Clip v2 on May 14, 2010.

Firmware version 01.01.29, released in May 2008, enabled Ogg Vorbis compatibility for the Sansa Clip. The 01.01.30 firmware update improved OGG support and added FLAC support. The latest firmware packages for the Sansa Clip are 01.01.35 and 02.01.35, which depend on the hardware revision.

The device (firmware 01.32+) has five folders: Audible (for Audible.com), Audiobooks (for files that you decide are audiobooks, allows for "bookmarking" of every file in this directory by a resume playback feature), Music, Podcasts (also allows every file in this directory to be resumed at a later time), Record (for recordings done on the device, these are in WAV file format).

Sansa Shaker 

The Sansa Shaker released in 2007 is a screenless digital audio player and comes in colors of blue, red, white, and pink with an SD card slot. One 512 MB or 1 GB card is included, and cards up to 4 GB (non-SDHC) can be used. The tubular design is intended to be kid-friendly, and the player resembles a saltshaker, as it will randomly skip one, two or three songs when shaken. The Shaker plays up to 10 hours of continuous audio with a AAA battery, and has twin headphone jacks and a built-in speaker. The upper controller band adjusts volume and the lower controller band skips to next/previous song or fast forwards/rewinds the current song when held. Unlike other players, the only supported audio file format is MP3. When the memory card is removed during playback, the player emits an "uh-oh" sound. When the player's memory card is put back in, it emits a popping sound.

Sansa Express 
The Sansa Express is a flash-based digital audio player in capacities of 1 GB and 2 GB. It has a built-in USB connector and a 1.1-inch, duochromatic OLED display, a microSD slot, an FM tuner, a microphone for voice recording, an internal Lithium-Ion battery, and a lanyard to wear it around the neck. It is also able to record FM radio and voice on its internal memory. This player is not considered as a descendant of the c200 series, as it only plays audio. It is more similar to the m200 series and maintains much of its design and internal software structure. It is the world's first known cable-less flash-based digital audio player, though a USB cable is included in the package if one is required to be used.

c200 series 

The Sansa c200 has a removable, lithium-ion rechargeable battery, FM tuner/recorder, and built-in microphone. It also features a 1.4-inch 132 x 80 pixel color display and a microSD card slot. The players are compatible with many accessories which were originally made for the Sansa e200 series. The Sansa c200 series is available in 1 GB (c240) and 2 GB (c250) capacities. Newer models, referred to as v. 2, have different hardware that added support for the Audible file format 2. The packaging of the new models has been updated with the line "Supports Audible audio file formats". The free software Rockbox firmware includes a number of additional features, including support for microSDHC even on C200 v1 which enables adding up to 32 GB of storage capacity.

e200 series 

The Sansa e200 series is the name of four portable media players with various capacities, and was released on January 5, 2006. It includes video player, FM tuner/recorder, voice recorder with built-in microphone, and picture viewer. The flash players are available in capacities of 2 GB (e250), 4 GB (e260), 6 GB (e270), and 8 GB (e280). There is also a microSD slot for up to 2 GB memory expansion. (Larger capacity microSDHC cards up to 32 GB are not supported by the original version 1 firmware but can be used with alternative Rockbox firmware, or on the version 2 player.)

The Sansa e200R was released in October 2006. Physically identical to the regular Sansa e200, this player is sold exclusively at retailer Best Buy or directly through Rhapsody. The player has a feature called Rhapsody Channels, which is the online service's brand of podcasting, and also comes with preloaded content. The Rhapsody firmware also added support for AAC audio files. A regular e200 could be flashed into an e200R and back again.

Sansa Connect 
The Sansa Connect is a Wi-Fi-enabled player that allows the user to connect to any open network in the area. The Mono/Linux-based device has a 2.2-inch TFT LCD screen, but unlike SanDisk's previous player, the e200 series, the Sansa Connect does not have the ability to connect via USB mass storage or tune to FM radio yet. The player was developed by ZING Systems in collaboration with SanDisk and Yahoo!, which provides music streaming via LAUNCHcast radio and a subscription download service. Viewing pictures from Flickr is also possible with the device. The Sansa Connect is currently only available in the United States in capacities of 4 GB. The storage capacity is expandable with microSD cards, currently giving the player up to an extra 2 GB of storage. At the 2007 Consumer Electronics Show, the Sansa Connect won the Best of Show award. A new firmware update allows the player to support microSDHC cards up to a capacity of 8 GB and the playback of digital video.

Sansa View 
The original Sansa View was SanDisk's attempt at a portable media player, and had a 4-inch screen, built-in speaker and an expansion slot for SDHC and SD cards. It was announced on the 2007 Consumer Electronics Show. On June 1, 2007, SanDisk announced that the player had been shelved. It has since been redesigned and launched.

c100 series 
The Sansa c100 series players have color displays and are able to show cover art and small picture thumbnails. They use AAA batteries and are available in 1 GB (c140) or 2 GB (c150) of capacity. They also have built in microphones for recording and settings they also have radio and music.

m200 series 

The Sansa m200 series are digital audio players that have been released in four models: m230 (512MB), m240 (1 GB), m250 (2 GB), and m260 (4 GB). The players have a built-in FM tuner and microphone, and supports MP3, WMA, WAV, and Audible (.aa) audio file formats. It comes in different colors (one for each memory size) such as blue, black, pink, and gray, and uses a single AAA battery for power. There were four different hardware revisions of this player. The first three revisions used a Telechips TCC770 SoC for a CPU and DSP, and the fourth using a chip developed by Austria Microsystems and also used in the Clip, Fuze and later e200/c200 models.

e100 series 

The Sansa e100 series is a monochromatic player with a blue backlight, FM tuner with 20 presets, SRS WOW technology, an SD expansion slot capable of using cards up to 2 GB (non-SDHC), internal memory of 512 MB (e130) or 1 GB (e140), comes in two different colors (blue or gray, depending on the model), and uses a single AAA battery for power. It supports MP3, WMA and Audible file formats. The e140 series also known as Sansa SDMX2. Release date was January 12, 2006.

SanDisk SDMX1 
The SanDisk SDMX1 (including SDMX1-1024, −512, and −256—reflecting capacity in MB), also known as the SanDisk Digital Audio Player, is a low-end solid state memory MP3 player. It was SanDisk's first personal media player, and the only one not to carry the Sansa brand. It can handle MP3, WMA and the protected WMA DRM files. It cannot play seamlessly, and imposes a non-configurable fade at the beginning and end of each file. There is a microphone for low-fidelity (8 kHz) voice recording, and there is a built in FM radio. The SanDisk SDMX1 is powered by a single AAA battery that gives around 15 hours of continuous playback. The dimensions are 75.2 mm x 32.8 mm x 20.8 mm and weighing under . Its release date was January 11, 2006.

Sansa TakeTV 
Released October 26, 2007, the Sansa TakeTV is an easy to use plug-and-play storage device that allows the playback of DivX, Xvid, and M-PEG 4 files on an external display via the included dock and remote. Unlike other Sansa products, the TakeTV is not a digital audio player. The device comes in 4 and 8 GB. While the user is free to use his own videos, TakeTV comes with FanFare, a program similar to iTunes, allowing the user to purchase premium content. On December 11, NBCUniversal signed up with SanDisk to provide content on FanFare after having left Apple Inc. in a similar deal. The TakeTV along with FanFare was discontinued on May 15, 2008.

Marketing campaigns 

In May 2006, SanDisk launched an anti-iPod campaign labelling iPod users as "iSheep", "iChimps", etc. These campaigns featured graffiti-type posters around urban areas and a website (iDont.com), in an effort to promote the e200 series. SanDisk has since replaced the iDont campaign with LilMonsta.com, which is also the name of the creature that resembles the player. In June 2008, the LilMonsta.com was shut down in favor of the new website.

On September 3, 2006, SanDisk announced the "Made for Sansa" program, following the similar program by Apple Inc. for its iPod. With it, a number of 3rd party accessories have been released, including hardware accessories mostly for the proprietary 30-pin IO port featured on the e200, c200, Connect, View, and Fuze players.

Maki Goto, a Japanese pop artist has also endorsed the Sansa e200 series with a promotional video, featuring one of her songs.

See also 

 SanDisk
 Comparison of portable media players
 Rockbox (alternative, open source firmware)

Notes

External links 

 SanDisk Sansa Online Store
 SanDisk Sansa Micro Site

Digital audio players
Screenless digital audio players
Portable media players
Consumer electronics brands
SanDisk products